Sahamiyeh may refer to:
 Sahamiyeh, Ardestan